In positive psychology, zest (or enthusiasm) is one of the 24 strengths possessed by humanity. As a component of the virtue of courage, zest is defined as living life with a sense of excitement, anticipation, and energy. Approaching life as an adventure; such that one has "motivation in challenging situations or tasks". Zest is essentially a concept of courage, and involves acquiring the motivation to complete challenging situations and tasks. Those who have zest exude enthusiasm, excitement, and energy while approaching tasks in life. Hence, the concept of zest involves performing tasks wholeheartedly, whilst also being adventurous, vivacious and energetic. It discourages the focus on the negative views of psychology. It embraces a notion that one must observe people that "live well" in order to truly understand positive psychology. (For example, a Buddhist monk would be a preferred subject of observation compared to a college student.) Zestful people simply enjoy things more than people low in zestfulness. Zest is a positive trait reflecting a person's approach to life with anticipation, energy, enthusiasm and excitement.

Christopher Peterson and Martin Seligman developed terminology to describe human strengths. They developed a descriptive list of six human virtues (Wisdom and Knowledge, Courage, Humanity, Justice, Temperance, and Transcendence) comprising 24 strengths.  Zest is one of the four strengths that combine to make up the virtue of courage, as defined by this system.

Measurement
The VIA-IS is a self-report questionnaire that assesses the strength with which respondents answer strength-relevant statements about themselves on a 1-5 Likert scale.  The following statements on the VIA-IS are used to measure a persons zest: I look forward to each new day; I cannot wait to get started on a project; I want to fully participate in life, not just view it from the sidelines.

Criticism

As with many other constructs in the relatively new field of Positive Psychology, it is difficult to quantify zest. Other traits like socioeconomic status, which can easily be measured by gross income per household, or constructs like fear, which can be quantified by changes in heart rate, skin conductance, and pupil dilation, have much more defined and widely accepted methods of measure. However, measurements of Zest are still in the beginning stages of development. How do we measure how energetic one person is compared to another? How do we determine exactly how excited a person is about life? What precisely does it mean to approach life adventurously? These are just a few of the questions that must be answered to most effectively research zest.

Relating to the problem of operationalizing zest, much of the research currently done on this and many of the 24 character strengths are done via self-report. A Self report study is one in which participants are simply asked to report their own feelings or thoughts. There are many problems in research associated with self-report. The most pertinent one being the validity and reliability of measures as they are completely subjective rather than objective. People can misrepresent themselves or misinterpret the questions posed to them.

Since such data is not the most scientifically convincing body of evidence upon which to rest scientific conclusions, Positive Psychological research is very focused on developing more objective measures for topics such as zest in order to help build a stronger science of organizational behavior.

Work

Zest can be promoted in the workplace so that workers can have a more positive approach in their life which indirectly can affect their anticipation, excitement, and energy in the workplace. Evidence from a present study that had 9803 employed adults respond to a survey on an internet site, measured zest, orientation to work as a calling, and satisfaction to work and life in general. The survey showed that for many of the employees, work was a calling and a satisfaction. Employers can use such information to increase the productivity of their employees by taking zest into consideration. The study found that professionals had the highest zest, while clerical workers and homemakers were the least zestful. Professionals and homemakers viewed their job as a calling, while clerical workers were the least likely to do so. Clerical workers displayed one of the lowest levels of zest because in most instances they viewed their work as a career, a pedestal in the hopes of acquiring status and power to find a more suitable job for themselves in the future. The results of this study follow trends observed by many other studies as well.

Zest is speculated to be contagious just like many other strengths of character. Zest is obviously connected to, if not equal to group morale and can be a point of discussion for new studies from a positive organizational perspective with emphasis on zest. Psychologists have learned about two main ways of promoting zest within workers: physical fitness and health set the tone for zest and it can be sustained through hope and optimism. Depression is a well-documented enemy of zest, and its toll on productivity and physical health is enormous. The prevention or reduction of depression among workers might pay the additional benefit of increasing their sense that work is a calling.

Zest is also linked to psychological well-being which is crucial in a work organization. For instance, psychological well-being predicts improved job performance, reduced absenteeism and reduced employee turnover. These are all benefits that can be explored more critically to make changes in the workplace.

Increasing zestfulness is highly likely to increase the ability to be habitually happy.

The results of a 2009 study on 228 schoolteacher in Hong Kong indicated that zest was often associated with positive emotions as well as increased levels of life satisfaction in teachers. It is suggested that cultivating zest in school teachers could help combat teacher burnout. Overall, zest is said to be one character strength that coincides with healthy working behaviors such as ambition, creativity, persistence and leadership, demonstrating that strengths-based interventions that cultivate zest can help improve work environments (see application for more information).It is also suggested that zest should be cultivated in the workplace in order to increase work satisfaction as well as general life satisfaction. The cultivation of zest may also decrease workplace burnout, which is the loss of productivity and enthusiasm for working.

Positive youth development
Zest, along with gratitude, hope, curiosity and love, are important aspects of positive psychology and key to positive character development. The adequate promotion of these characteristics not only in domestic life but also in schools and other educational environments is extremely important to positive youth development. Furthermore, through promotion of character strengths such as zest children tend to experience fewer psychological problems such as depression and anxiety disorders. In fact, research shows that zest, along with hope and leadership, is associated with fewer issues with anxiety and depression. This suggests that the cultivation of zest can serve as a buffer against mental illness.

Youths with high levels of zest also tend to excel academically and lead happier, brighter lives. More emphasis needs to be placed on positive developing characteristics such as zest, gratitude, hope, curiosity and love in schooling environments and live in general so that youth successfully and positively develop.

Life satisfaction and Zest 
Zest has been found to be linked to higher levels of life satisfaction among adults as well as youths. Studies suggest that certain character strengths, including zest as well as curiosity, gratitude, hope, and humor are highly correlated with life satisfaction, whereas others strengths demonstrate low correlations with life satisfaction (appreciation of beauty and excellence, creativity, kindness, love of learning and perspective)  It is suggested that zest is associated with higher life satisfaction because it is associated with living in the "here and now," which is also associated with life satisfaction. Furthermore, it is difficult to imagine zestful people who are often unhappy.

Demographics 
Certain character strengths, including zest, have been found to be more common among youths than adults. This possibly reflects the influence of social and cognitive maturation and certain needs during different developmental periods 

In yet another study that reaffirmed the idea that zest was one of the VIA character strengths that had a strong link to life satisfaction, another trend in zest was discovered. This study indicated slight gender differences in levels of zest. For women, life satisfaction was predicted by zest, gratitude, hope, appreciation of beauty and love, whereas men's life satisfaction was predicted by creativity, perspective, fairness and humor. These findings go along with gender stereotypes and suggest that life satisfaction comes when one lives according to the strengths especially valued in one's culture.

Zest and mental state 
There is evidence on the VIA-Youth subscale that zest is correlated with higher levels of neuroticism as well.

Levels of zest have been found to be linked with post-traumatic growth, meaning that levels of zest increased with each traumatic event. This suggest that people may be more resilient than existing theories state, given the correlation between traumatic events and increases in character strengths such as zest

Application 
There are a few working ways to help individuals cultivate zest:

One method to cultivate zest is acting "as if,' which involves living a "faith-based" rather than an "evidenced-based" life. This means believing in things that there may not be much evidence for or proof of. Additionally, adopting strong body language may help, as well as "faking it until you make it" meaning acting as though one has an increased enthusiasm for life (more zest) until that increased enthusiasm is a reality (thus, an increase in zest is a reality) .

Another 2012 study demonstrated that groups that trained strengths (worked to cultivate these strengths) which are highly correlated with life satisfaction (including zest), had significant improvements in self-reported life satisfaction post-test (after training those strengths). Zest can be an important characteristic to cultivate life satisfaction, thereby acting as a potential buffer against mental illness.

See also
 Character Strengths and Virtues
Flow

Notes

References

Positive psychology
Emotions